Sir Thomas Fitzadam (died after 1223) was a leading administrator in Ireland during the reigns of King John of England and his son Henry III. He held a wide variety of official positions, including military commander, Constable of Dublin Castle and  Chief Escheator of Ireland. He was one of the first three judges to be appointed an itinerant justice in Ireland.

He is first heard of in 1210. He and his brother Richard were Irish by birth, and it is possible that one or the other was the ancestor of John Fitzadam (died c.1419), the long-serving Lord Chief Justice of Ireland, who came from an old Dublin family.  

He was in attendance on King John on his expedition to Ireland in 1210, and was a commander in the army which drove the rebellious nobles Walter de Lacy, Lord of Meath and his father-in-law William de Braose, north into Ulster. He regularly visited England to advise the King on Irish matters, and received a knighthood. In 1213 he was made constable of Dublin Castle, and later became constable of Trim Castle (1215) and Athlone Castle (1223). 

thumb|Trim Castle

In 1217 the Crown ordered Geoffrey de Marisco, the Justiciar of Ireland, to help Thomas fortify his own castle at "Corcobasky Ethragh" (Corkobasky was possibly modern Kilkee) in County Clare, which had been granted to him by the previous Justiciar John de Grey, Bishop of Norwich. In 1220 he received other lands in County Dublin at Chapelizod, and at Rathsallagh, Castleknock, to hold at the King's pleasure, at a rent of 100 shillings a year. These lands had previously been held by Thomas's colleague Richard de la Feld, who apparently died in 1220.

In 1218 he was appointed Chief Escheator for Ireland. He was clearly an able and conscientious official, and later that year was able to send £500 to the English Exchequer. He also engaged in litigation against Henry de Loundres, the Archbishop of Dublin, on the Crown's behalf in 1220. He continued to visit England to advise the youthful King and his Council. In 1219 he was named as Royal Forester for the Irish forests: in fact Glencree in County Wicklow seems to have been the only Irish royal forest at this time.

In 1221 he was the second justice itinerant: this seems to be the first reference to the eyre system in Ireland. We have the name of one of the third justices, the cleric Bartholemew de Camera, parson of Limerick Chapel, but the name of the senior justice is missing (the earliest reference to a first justice seems to be seven years later).Otway-Ruthven states that Thomas had in fact been acting as a judge for some time previously, and that the 
reforms of 1221 saw not the creation of a new system, but a formalising of existing procedures, so that the three justices would normally sit together as a bench. 

Thomas was still alive at the end of 1223 when he sent his servant Lawrence to England on Crown business. The next appointment to the Irish Bench seems to have been John Marshal, Baron of Hingham, a nephew of the leading noble William Marshal, who became senior justice itinerant in 1228. In the same year Sir Richard Duket, a long-serving English-born Crown official who also had experience as an itinerant justice and as a diplomat, was appointed second justice, suggesting that Thomas had recently died or retired.

Irish judges

Sources
Ball, F. Elrington The Judges in Ireland 1221-1921 London John Murray 1926
Empey, C A. The Settlement of the Kingdom of Limerick Irish Academic Press 1981
Otway-Ruthven, A.J. History of Medieval Ireland New York Barnes and Noble reissue 1993
Sweetman, H.S. (ed.) Calendar of Documents Relating to Ireland 5 volumes reprinted 1974

Footnotes